Blitzkrieg Over Nüremberg is the first live album by American blues-rock band Blue Cheer. It features a cover of Jimi Hendrix's classic "Red House".

Track listing 
 "Babylon" (Dickie Peterson)/"Girl Next Door" (Tony Rainier) – 9:20
 "Ride with Me" (Tony Rainier) – 8:50
 "Just a Little Bit" (Dickie Peterson) – 4:27
 "Summertime Blues" (Jerry Capehart, Eddie Cochran) – 6:39
 "Out of Focus" (Dickie Peterson) – 4:36
 "Doctor Please" (Dickie Peterson) – 12:05
 "The Hunter" (Booker T. Jones) – 6:37
 "Red House" (Jimi Hendrix) – 8:47

Personnel 
 Dickie Peterson – bass guitar, vocals
 Duck MacDonald – lead guitar, vocals
 Dave Salce – drums

References

1989 live albums
Blue Cheer albums